American Horror Story (sometimes abbreviated as AHS) is an American horror anthology television series co-created by Ryan Murphy and Brad Falchuk. Each season is conceived as a self-contained miniseries, following a different set of characters and settings, and a storyline with its own beginning, middle, and end. However, Murphy has stated that all of the seasons are and will be connected by the end of the series. Some plot elements of each season are loosely inspired by true events.

The first season, retroactively subtitled Murder House, takes place in Los Angeles, California, during 2011, and centers on a family that moves into a house haunted by its deceased former occupants. The second season, subtitled Asylum, takes place in Massachusetts, during 1964, and follows the stories of the patients and staff of an institution for the criminally insane. The third season, subtitled Coven, takes place in New Orleans, Louisiana, during 2013, and follows a coven of witches who face off against those who wish to destroy them. The fourth season, subtitled Freak Show, takes place in Jupiter, Florida, during 1952, and focuses on one of the last remaining American freak shows and their struggle for survival. The fifth season, subtitled Hotel, takes place in Los Angeles, California, during 2015, and focuses on the staff and guests of a supernatural hotel. The sixth season, subtitled Roanoke, takes place in North Carolina, during 2014–2016, and focuses on the paranormal events that take place at an isolated farmhouse haunted by the deceased Roanoke colony. 

The seventh season, subtitled Cult, takes place in the fictional suburb of Brookfield Heights, Michigan, during 2017, and centers on a cult terrorizing the residents in the aftermath of the 2016 U.S. presidential election. The eighth season, subtitled Apocalypse, features the return of the witches from Coven as they battle the Antichrist from Murder House in an attempt to prevent the apocalypse. The ninth season, subtitled 1984, takes place outside of Los Angeles, California, during the titular year, 1984, and focuses on a group of young staff members at a summer camp getting ready to reopen after a massacre. The tenth season, Double Feature, is split into two stories; the first half, Red Tide, centres around a screenwriter who moves to Provincetown, Massachusetts with his family for the winter; the second half, Death Valley, revolves around an alien invasion of the United States and the response of the U.S. government. The eleventh season, subtitled NYC, takes place in New York City in the early 80s and follows members of the LGBT community who are targeted by a serial killer, as a mysterious virus is being carefully monitored.
In January 2020, FX renewed the series through to season 13.

Some characters have appeared in multiple seasons: Pepper (Naomi Grossman) was the first, appearing in Freak Show after having appeared in Asylum. Hotel, Roanoke, Cult and NYC also had characters from previous seasons making appearances. As a crossover between Murder House and Coven, several characters from those two seasons reappeared in Apocalypse.

Cast members

See also
 List of American Horror Story: Murder House characters
 List of American Horror Story: Asylum characters
 List of American Horror Story: Coven characters
 List of American Horror Story: Freak Show characters
 List of American Horror Story: Hotel characters
 List of American Horror Story: Roanoke characters
 List of American Horror Story: Cult characters
 List of American Horror Story: Apocalypse characters
 List of American Horror Story: 1984 characters
 List of American Horror Story: Double Feature characters
 List of American Horror Story: NYC characters

References

Cast members
American Horror Story